The Florida Marlins' 2002 season was the tenth season for the Major League Baseball (MLB) franchise in the National League.  It would begin with the team attempting to improve on their season from 2001. Their manager was Jeff Torborg. They played home games at Pro Player Stadium. They finished with a record of 79-83, 4th in the NL East.

Offseason
February 18, 2002: Tim Raines signed as a free agent with the Florida Marlins. He was the last batter to wear a flapless helmet, which has been illegal for new batters since the 1983 season.
March 27, 2002: Dontrelle Willis was traded by the Chicago Cubs with Jose Cueto (minors), Ryan Jorgensen, and Julián Tavárez to the Florida Marlins for Antonio Alfonseca and Matt Clement.

Regular season

Season standings

National League East

Record vs. opponents

Citrus series
The annual interleague games between the Florida Marlins and the Tampa Bay Devil Rays were played in June and July. They are known as the Citrus Series. The Devil Rays won the series 4-2.

Notable transactions
 June 4, 2002: Jeremy Hermida was drafted by the Florida Marlins in the 1st round (11th pick) of the 2002 amateur draft. Player signed July 5, 2002.
July 11, 2002: Cliff Floyd was traded by the Florida Marlins with Wilton Guerrero, Claudio Vargas, and cash to the Montreal Expos for a player to be named later, Graeme Lloyd, Mike Mordecai, Carl Pavano, and Justin Wayne. The Montreal Expos sent Donald Levinski (minors) (August 5, 2002) to the Florida Marlins to complete the trade.

Roster

Player stats

Batting

Starters by position 
Note: Pos = Position; G = Games played; AB = At bats; H = Hits; Avg. = Batting average; HR = Home runs; RBI = Runs batted in

Other batters 
Note: G = Games played; AB = At bats; H = Hits; Avg. = Batting average; HR = Home runs; RBI = Runs batted in

Pitching

Starting pitchers 
Note: G = Games pitched; IP = Innings pitched; W = Wins; L = Losses; ERA = Earned run average; SO = Strikeouts

Other pitchers 
Note: G = Games pitched; IP = Innings pitched; W = Wins; L = Losses; ERA = Earned run average; SO = Strikeouts

Relief pitchers 
Note: G = Games pitched; W = Wins; L = Losses; SV = Saves; ERA = Earned run average; SO = Strikeouts

Farm system

References

External links
2002 Florida Marlins at Baseball Reference
2002 Florida Marlins at Baseball Almanac

Miami Marlins seasons
Florida Marlins season
Miami